Donald Watson (2 September 1910 – 16 November 2005) was an English animal rights advocate who co-founded The Vegan Society.

Early life
Watson was born in Mexborough, Yorkshire, the son of a headmaster in a mining community. As a child, Watson spent time on his uncle George's farm. The slaughtering of a pig on the farm horrified Watson; he said his view of farm life changed from idyllic to a death row for animals. Watson began to reassess his practice of eating meat. He became a vegetarian in 1924 at the age of fourteen, making a New Year's resolution to never again eat meat. He gave up dairy products about 18 years later, having understood the production of milk-related products was also unethical.

He said:

Teaching
Upon leaving school at fifteen, Watson was apprenticed to a family joinery firm, and became a joinery teacher when he was twenty. He taught in Leicester, where he also played a large part in the Leicester Vegetarian Society. He moved on to Keswick, where he taught for 23 years. He stayed in the Lake District for the rest of his life. For several years, he devoted much time to working as a guided fell-walking leader, as well as to organic vegetable gardening, until very shortly before his death in 2005.

Veganism and The Vegan Society
As Watson grew up, he did not smoke, consume alcohol, or make contact with foods or substances which he regarded as toxins. In the 1940s, after learning about milk production; he became a vegan. He explained his motivation as ethical concern for sentient animals:

Critics claimed that he could not survive on his proposed diet. In November 1944, in Leicester, he and his wife, Dorothy, along with four friends—Elsie Shrigley, Mr G. A. Henderson and his wife Fay K. Henderson among them—founded The Vegan Society. They separated from the London Vegetarian Society and founded The Vegan Society because the former group refused to support veganism, which they saw as extreme and antisocial. (However, Watson remained a member of the London Vegetarian Society to keep in touch with the movement.) They had also decided they needed a word to describe their new way of life. The word 'vegan' was coined by Watson and his then-future wife Dorothy Morgan from the first three and last two letters of 'vegetarian' in 1944.

Watson and The Vegan Society launched the first edition of the Society's quarterly newsletter, The Vegan News, in 1944. He ran the publication single-handed for two years, writing and duplicating the newsletter, and responding to the increasing volume of correspondence.

Watson expanded the vegan philosophy to object to any harm to living creatures. A committed pacifist throughout his life, Watson registered as a conscientious objector in World War II.

Personal life
Watson enjoyed cycling, photography and playing the violin. While not a supporter of any particular political party, he took a keen interest in political issues throughout his life. He was an agnostic.

His brother and sister both adopted vegan lifestyles. All three Watson siblings registered as conscientious objectors during World War II.

Together with his wife, Watson had one child, Janet.

Commemoration 
In November 2019, a blue plaque was unveiled in honour of Donald Watson at his former Doncaster Road School, in Mexborough, South Yorkshire. The plaque was organised by Mexborough and District Heritage Society, and unveiled by Watson's nephew Dr Tim Cook, in honour of the seventy fifth anniversary of the foundation of The Vegan Society. His funeral was held at St Kentigern's Church, Crosthwaite and he is buried in its cemetery.

See also
 List of animal rights advocates

References

External links

 First issue of "The Vegan News", the Vegan Society newsletter November 1944, Published and written by Donald Watson. Accessed November 2009
 Ripened by human determination: 70 years of The Vegan Society. Document explores how Donald Watson and others founded The Vegan Society.
 Vegan Society 70th anniversary

1910 births
2005 deaths
British veganism activists
English agnostics
English animal rights activists
English conscientious objectors
English pacifists
Organization founders
People associated with the Vegetarian Society
People from Mexborough